Pyrosomes, genus Pyrosoma, are free-floating colonial tunicates that usually live in the upper layers of the open ocean in warm seas, although some may be found at greater depths. Colonies range in size from less than one centimeter to several metres in length. They are commonly called "sea pickles". Other nicknames include "sea worms", "sea squirts", "fire bodies", and "cockroaches of the sea".

Each zooid is a few millimetres in size, but is embedded in a common gelatinous tunic that joins all of the individuals. Each zooid opens both to the inside and outside of the "tube", drawing in ocean water from the outside to its internal filtering mesh called the branchial basket, extracting the microscopic plant cells on which it feeds, and then expelling the filtered water to the inside of the cylinder of the colony. The colony is bumpy on the outside, each bump representing a single zooid, but nearly smooth, although perforated with holes for each zooid, on the inside.

Pyrosomes are planktonic, which means their movements are largely controlled by currents, tides, and waves in the oceans. On a smaller scale, however, each colony can move itself slowly by the process of jet propulsion, created by the coordinated beating of cilia in the branchial baskets of all the zooids, which also create feeding currents.

Pyrosomes are brightly bioluminescent, flashing a pale blue-green light that can be seen for many tens of metres.  Pyrosomes are closely related to salps, and are sometimes called "fire salps". Sailors on the ocean occasionally observe calm seas containing many pyrosomes, all luminescing on a dark night.

Pyrosomes feed through filtration and they are among the most efficient filter feeders of any zooplankton species.

Etymology
The name Pyrosoma derives from the Greek words pyro, meaning "fire", and soma, meaning "body".

Bioluminescence
Although many planktonic organisms are bioluminescent, pyrosome bioluminescence is unusual in its brilliance and sustained light emission, and evoked the following comment when seen by the eminent scientist Thomas Huxley at sea:"I have just watched the moon set in all her glory, and looked at those lesser moons, the beautiful Pyrosoma, shining like white-hot cylinders in the water" (T.H. Huxley, 1849).

Pyrosomes often exhibit waves of light passing back and forth through the colony, as each individual zooid detects light and then emits light in response. Each zooid contains a pair of light organs located near the outside surface of the tunic, which are packed with luminescent organelles that may be intracellular bioluminescent bacteria. The waves of bioluminescence that move within a colony are apparently not propagated by neurons, but by a photic stimulation process. Flashing zooids not only stimulate other zooids within the colony to luminesce, but nearby colonies will also display bioluminescence in response. Colonies will luminesce in response to touch, as well as to light.

Species

The following species are accepted as valid by the World Register of Marine Species:

Pyrosoma aherniosum Seeliger, 1895
Pyrosoma atlanticum Péron, 1804
Pyrosoma godeauxi van Soest, 1981
Pyrosoma ovatum Neumann, 1909

Bloom in North Pacific
In 2017, pyrosomes were observed to have spread in unprecedented numbers along the Pacific coast of North America as far north as Alaska. The causes remain unknown, but one hypothesis is that this bloom may have resulted in part from unusually warm water along the coast over several preceding years. Scientists were concerned that should there be a massive die-off of the pyrosomes, it could create a huge dead zone as the decomposition of their bodies could consume much of the oxygen dissolved in the surrounding seawater.

Pyrosome as prey
Many type of organisms have been spotted eating pyrosome; so far these organisms are sea turtles, sea birds, different species of fish (their primary source of prey are pyrosomes), sea urchins and crabs.

References

Bibliography 
Bone, Q. editor (1998) The Biology of Pelagic Tunicates. Oxford University Press, Oxford. 340 pp.

External links

Huge pyrosome captured in the North Atlantic - story and images
Images taken by divers off southern California
The Bioluminescence Web Page
Divers with huge southern hemisphere pyrosomes
Millions of tropical sea creatures invade waters off B.C. coast
Researchers Investigate Explosion in the Number of Pyrosomes off Alaska
 

Thaliacea
Tunicate genera
Bioluminescent animals
Taxa named by François Péron